Gasperoni is a surname. Notable people with the surname include:

Alex Gasperoni (born 1984), Sammarinese footballer
Bryan Gasperoni (born 1974), Sammarinese footballer
Cesare Gasperoni, Captains Regent of San Marino
Cristian Gasperoni (born 1970), Italian former cyclist
Ermenegildo Gasperoni (1906–1994), Sammarinese politician
Federico Gasperoni (born 1976), Sammarinese footballer and cyclist
Jason Gasperoni (born  1973), Sammarinese alpine skier
Lorenzo Gasperoni (born 1990), Sammarinese footballer